Lise Hilboldt (born January 7, 1954) is an American actress. She had a leading role in the romantic comedy film Sweet Liberty (1986), co-starring with writer-director Alan Alda and Michael Caine, and was featured in Noon Wine (1985).

Career 
She appeared in S.O.S. Titanic (1979), Ike (1979), the UK TV series A Married Man (1983, with Anthony Hopkins), The Hunger (1983), George Washington II: The Forging of a Nation (1986), The Karen Carpenter Story (1989), and Nancy Astor (1982) with Pierce Brosnan. She has a small role in the film Superman (1978). She co-starred with Ken Howard in the PBS feature adaptation of Mark Twain's Pudd'nhead Wilson.

Hilboldt guest-starred opposite Martin Shaw in an episode of The Professionals titled "A Hiding to Nothing". She played the part of a terrorist who gets close to Doyle. She had a co-starring role as a nightclub singer in the 1983 episode "The King in Yellow" of the HBO series Philip Marlowe, Private Eye, which starred Powers Boothe.

Personal life
Hilboldt was married to publicist and former journalist Allan Mayer. In the 1990s, they worked together at Buzz Magazine, where Mayer was the founding editor and publisher and Hilboldt wrote a column. In 1997, she married Richard Stolley, the founding editor of People magazine. The marriage ended in divorce. She lives in Santa Fe, New Mexico.

Filmography

Film

Television

References

External links
 

1954 births
Actresses from Wisconsin
American film actresses
American television actresses
Living people
People from Racine, Wisconsin
21st-century American women